The FMA I.Ae. 37 was a prototype jet fighter developed in Argentina during the 1950s. It never flew and was cancelled in 1960.

Development
Reimar Horten began work on the I.Ae. 37 around 1952, after his earlier flying wing projects were cancelled in 1951. This was a single-engined jet fighter that used a Delta wing flying wing structure with lateral engine inlets on each side of the nose. A full scale glider was built and made its first flight on 1 October 1954. Most unusually the pilot lay prone and looked out through the clear nose. Flight performance was deemed excellent and manufacture of a prototype powered by a Rolls-Royce Derwent V began in 1955. This engine was selected as it was readily available, but lacked the thrust desired for the fighter. The glider was modified with a normal cockpit in 1956. Shortly afterwards the program was split with the current aircraft becoming a subsonic trainer and a new, more powerful fighter, designated as the I.Ae. 48, with two podded engines under the wings and intended to reach Mach 2.2 (2,700 km/h). However, both projects were cancelled in 1960 as an economy measure, only a year before the I.Ae. 37 was to fly.

Specifications (I.Ae. 37)

See also
 I.Ae. 48

References

Notes

Bibliography

 
 .
 .
 I.Ae 37
 I.Ae. 37 schematic
 .
 .

External links
 

1950s Argentine fighter aircraft
Abandoned military aircraft projects of Argentina
I.Ae.37
Flying wings
Prone pilot aircraft
Single-engined jet aircraft